Mark MacKay (born 28 May 1964) is a German ice hockey player. He competed in the men's tournaments at the 1998 Winter Olympics and the 2002 Winter Olympics.

Career statistics

Regular season and playoffs

International

Awards
 WHL East Second All-Star Team – 1985

References

1964 births
Living people
Olympic ice hockey players of Germany
Ice hockey people from Manitoba
Ice hockey players at the 1998 Winter Olympics
Ice hockey players at the 2002 Winter Olympics
Sportspeople from Brandon, Manitoba